Elena Sergeyevna Oriabinskaia (born 15 March 1994) is a Russian rower. She and Vasilisa Stepanova won silver in the coxless pair event at the 2020 Summer Olympics held in 2021 in Tokyo.

References

Rowers at the 2020 Summer Olympics
Medalists at the 2020 Summer Olympics
Olympic medalists in rowing
1994 births
Living people
Russian female rowers
Olympic rowers of Russia
Olympic silver medalists for the Russian Olympic Committee athletes
People from Salsk
Sportspeople from Rostov Oblast